George Albert Wood (November 9, 1858 – April 4, 1924), also known as "Dandy" Wood, was a Canadian-born professional baseball player and manager whose career spanned from 1878 to 1896. He played 13 seasons of Major League Baseball, primarily as an outfielder, for the Worcester Ruby Legs (1880), Detroit Wolverines (1881–85), Philadelphia Quakers (1886–89), Philadelphia Athletics (1890–91), Baltimore Orioles (1889, 1892), and Cincinnati Reds (1892). In 1891, he served as both a player and the manager of the Athletics.

Early years
Wood was born in Pownal, Prince Edward Island, Canada, in 1858. He was the son of Joseph A. Wood and Mary Ann Jenkins and is believed to be the first major league player from Prince Edward Island, and one of only three in major league history, along with Henry Oxley and Vern Handrahan. Wood moved with his family to East Boston as a child in 1867.

Professional baseball career

Worcester
Wood began his professional baseball career in 1878 and 1879 playing for teams in Worcester, Massachusetts, and Manchester, New Hampshire.  His batting average in 1879 was .368. In December 1879, he travelled to Havana as the left fielder of the first  American team to play a Cuban all-star team.

In 1880, the Worcester baseball club became known as the Worcester Ruby Legs and was admitted to the National League.  Wood made his major league debut with Worcester on May 1, 1880.  On May 7, 1880, he initiated a triple play.  Wood appeared in 81 of 83 games in Worcester's inaugural major league season, with 80 of those games being as an outfielder. Playing against National League competition, Wood's batting average dropped from .368 in 1879 to .245 in 1880. Wood played well defensively, however, and his .887 fielding percentage was the fifth highest among all of the league's outfielders.

Integrated baseball
Wood also participated in an early integrated baseball game. The Chicago Tribune reported on the game as follows: "A very singular contest took place at New Orleans‚ La.‚ on April 4‚ 1880‚ when five Northern professionals succeeded in defeating the colored professional nine of that city by a score of 17 to 3." According to the account reported 14 months later in the Chicago Tribune of July 1881‚ Tim Keefe pitched‚ Charlie Bennett caught‚ John Sullivan played first base‚ while Wood and George Creamer "were entrusted with the onerous task of filling the other six positions."

Detroit

In 1881, the National League admitted a new club in Detroit, Michigan, which became known as the Detroit Wolverines.  Frank Bancroft, who had been Wood's manager in Worcester, was hired as the manager of the new club, and Wood quickly agreed to join Bancroft in Detroit. Wood joined the Wolverines for their inaugural season in 1881 and remained a starter for the club through the 1885 season.

On May 2, 1881, Wood hit a triple, scored a run, and turned a double play in the first major league baseball game ever played in Detroit.  By the end of the 1881 season, Wood ranked among the National League leaders with nine triples (3rd), 29 extra base hits (8th), 142 total bases (9th), 100 hits (10th), and a .421 slugging percentage (10th).  The following year, in 1882, Wood was the National League's home run champion with seven home runs and ranked second in the league with 12 triples.  He also led the league's outfielders with eight double plays turned from the outfield and ranked fifth among the league's outfielders with an .884 fielding percentage.  Wood's eight double plays in 1882 tied Ned Hanlon for the major league record.

Wood had the best season of his career in 1883. That year, he compiled a .302 batting average with 26 doubles, 11 triples, five home runs, and 47 RBIs.  He also showed range in the outfield and led the league's outfielders with 226 outfield putouts.  Applying the sabermetric measure of Wins Above Replacement (WAR), Wood's performance in 1883 rated a 3.3, the highest of his career.  He continued to have strong seasons in 1884 and 1885 with WAR ratings of 2.1 and 2.4.  He would rate above a 2.0 WAR rating only one other time in his career—a 2.8 rating in 1891.  On June 12, 1885, Wood became the third player in National League history (and the eighth in any major league) to hit for the cycle.

Philadelphia

In November 1885, Wood was returned to the control of the National League and was claimed in January 1886 by the Philadelphia Quakers. Wood played four seasons for the Quakers from 1886 to 1889, compiling a .262 batting average with 80 doubles, 44 triples, 29 home runs, 220 RBIs and 65 stolen bases.  Wood was released by the Quakers on September 24, 1889, and appeared in three games for the Baltimore Orioles in the final week of the season.  On opening day in 1887, he hit the first home run at the new Philadelphia ball park dubbed the Baker Bowl.

During the winter after the 1888 season, Wood was part of the All-America baseball team that travelled around the world playing a series of games against the Chicago White Stockings.  The teams played games in Hawaii, New Zealand, Australia, Ceylon, Egypt, Italy, France, England, and Ireland and met with President Benjamin Harrison at the White House when they returned to the United States in April 1889.

In 1890, Wood jumped to the Players' League, playing for the Philadelphia Athletics.  Wood compiled a .289 batting average with 20 doubles, 14 triples, nine home runs, 102 RBIs, and 20 stolen bases in the Players' League.  He also led the league with 35 outfield assists.

The Players' League disbanded after the 1890 season, but the Philadelphia club was admitted to the American Association.  Wood stayed with the club and also served as the team's manager in 1891.  He led the team to 67–55 record and batted for a career high .309 average, eighth best in the league.  He was also among the league's leaders with 14 triples, (8th), 242 times on base (8th), and a .399 on-base percentage (9th).

Baltimore and Cincinnati
The 1892 season was Wood's last in the major leagues.  He played parts of the season for both the Baltimore Orioles (21 games) and the Cincinnati Reds (30 games).

Later years
After his playing career was over, Wood served as an umpire for a time.  He died in 1924 at Harrisburg, Pennsylvania, at age 65.  He has been posthumously inducted into the PEI Sports Hall of Fame (2009) and the Canadian Baseball Hall of Fame (2011).

See also
 List of Major League Baseball career triples leaders
 List of Major League Baseball annual home run leaders
 List of Major League Baseball annual saves leaders
 List of Major League Baseball players to hit for the cycle
 List of Major League Baseball player-managers

References

External links
, or Retrosheet

1858 births
1924 deaths
19th-century baseball players
Allentown Buffaloes players
Allentown Kelly's Killers players
Ashland (minor league baseball) players
Atlanta Crackers players
Baltimore Orioles (AA) players
Baltimore Orioles (NL) players
Baseball people from Prince Edward Island
Binghamton Bingoes players
Canadian Baseball Hall of Fame inductees
Canadian expatriate baseball players in the United States
Detroit Wolverines players
People from Queens County, Prince Edward Island
Major League Baseball left fielders
Worcester Ruby Legs players
Philadelphia Quakers players
Philadelphia Athletics (PL) players
Philadelphia Athletics (AA 1891) players
Cincinnati Reds players
Philadelphia Athletics (AA 1891) managers
Major League Baseball player-managers
National League home run champions
Lynn Live Oaks players
Worcester (minor league baseball) players
Manchester (minor league baseball) players
Worcester Grays players
Wilkes-Barre Coal Barons players
Easton (minor league baseball) players
Major League Baseball players from Canada